Keith Patrick Kinkaid (born July 4, 1989) is an American professional ice hockey goaltender for the Colorado Eagles in the American Hockey League (AHL) while under contract to the Colorado Avalanche of the National Hockey League (NHL).

Playing career

Born and raised in Farmingville, New York, Kinkaid graduated from Sachem High School East in 2007.

Kinkaid played for the St. Louis Bandits of the North American Hockey League for the 2008–09 season. In February 2009, Kinkaid committed to play NCAA Division I hockey for Union College. That April, Kinkaid was named MVP and Goaltender of the Year after he led all NAHL goaltenders in wins, goals-against average, save percentage and shutouts. He was also nominated for the Dave Tyler Junior Player of the Year Award.

Collegiate
Kinkaid played for Union College of ECAC Hockey from 2009–2011. In his freshman season, Kinkaid was named to the ECAC All-Rookie Team and Third Team.

After an outstanding sophomore season in which Kinkaid posted a 25-10-3 record and led the Dutchmen to their first NCAA tournament appearance, Kinkaid was named an AHCA East First-Team All-American. He was also named to the All-ECAC Hockey First Team and awarded the Ken Dryden Award as the best goaltender in the ECAC.

Kinkaid signed an entry level contract with the New Jersey Devils in April 2011 after his sophomore season with Union.

Professional
Kinkaid was assigned to the Devils' American Hockey League affiliate, the Albany Devils, for the 2011–12 season. He made his professional debut on October 9, 2011, in a 4–2 loss to the Bridgeport Sound Tigers. On October 14, Kinkaid earned his first career win in a 3–2 shootout over the Connecticut Whale. During that October, Kinkaid was recalled to the NHL to play as a backup for Johan Hedberg. However, Kinkaid did not play during the 6 games he was up for and he was returned to Albany without making his NHL debut. In his second game back in the AHL, Kinkaid recorded his first professional shutout against the Norfolk Admirals.

In the final stages of the 2012–13 season, Kinkaid was recalled from Albany, and made his NHL debut in a relief role with New Jersey on March 5, 2013, against the Tampa Bay Lightning at the Prudential Center. He spent the entirety of the following season with the Albany Devils before being recalled in 2014.

On June 29, 2017, Kinkaid re-signed with the Devils. In the 2017–18 season, after starter Cory Schneider suffered a groin injury on January 23, Kinkaid eventually served as the starter, and performed well, posting a 2.77 GAA. and a .913 save percentage. On April 5, 2018, Kinkaid made 30 saves to help the Devils beat the Toronto Maple Leafs and clinch their first playoff spot since 2012.

In the following 2018–19 season, on February 25, 2019, Kinkaid was traded to the Columbus Blue Jackets in exchange for a 2022 fifth-round draft pick. Acquired for added insurance to the Blue Jackets' Sergei Bobrovsky and Joonas Korpisalo, Kinkaid remained on the roster as the third choice goaltender and did not make an appearance with Columbus.

As a free agent from the Blue Jackets, Kinkaid was signed to a one-year, $1.75 million contract with the Montreal Canadiens on July 1, 2019. After playing six games for the Canadiens, and posting a .875 save percentage, Kinkaid was placed on waivers on December 2. After going unclaimed off waivers, he was assigned to the Canadiens' AHL affiliate, the Laval Rocket. In his first return to the AHL since the 2014–15 season, Kinkaid collected just 3 wins in 13 games with the Rocket. On February 29, 2020, Kinkaid was reassigned on loan by the Canadiens to the Charlotte Checkers of the AHL, the primary affiliate of the Carolina Hurricanes.

Kinkaid left the Canadiens organization after his lone season with the club, and was signed as a free agent to a two-year, $1.65 million contract with the New York Rangers on October 9, 2020. Kinkaid made his Rangers debut on March 7, 2021, in the Rangers' 5–1 loss to the Pittsburgh Penguins.

As a free agent from the Rangers, Kinkaid was signed to a one-year, two-way contract with the Boston Bruins on July 13, 2022. In the  season, Kinkaid was re-assigned to AHL affilaite, the Providence Bruins. On November 2, 2022, Kinkaid was recalled from Providence, following a lower body injury to Jeremy Swayman. He made his Bruins debut, collecting 30 saves, in a 3-1 victory over the Buffalo Sabres on November 12, 2022. Returned to the AHL following his lone appearance with Boston, Kinkaid earned 8 wins through 20 appearances with Providence.

On February 25, 2023, Kinkaid was traded by the Bruins to the Colorado Avalanche in exchange for Shane Bowers. Acquried to add positional depth to the Avalanche organization, Kinkaid was immediately assigned to AHL affiliate, the Colorado Eagles.

Career statistics

Regular season and playoffs

International

Awards and honors

References

External links

 

1989 births
Living people
AHCA Division I men's ice hockey All-Americans
Albany Devils players
American men's ice hockey goaltenders
Boston Bruins players
Charlotte Checkers (2010–) players
Colorado Avalanche players
Colorado Eagles players
Des Moines Buccaneers players
Hartford Wolf Pack players
Ice hockey players from New York (state)
Laval Rocket players
Montreal Canadiens players
New Jersey Devils players
New York Rangers players
People from Farmingville, New York
Providence Bruins players
Undrafted National Hockey League players
Union Dutchmen ice hockey players